Doctor Evelyn Clarice Sarah Necker is a fictional character appearing in American comic books published by Marvel Comics. She first appeared as a supporting character in Death's Head (second series) #1, published by the Marvel UK imprint, and was created by Dan Abnett and Liam Sharp.

Publication history
In 2008, writers Dan Abnett and Andy Lanning (DnA) used Doctor Necker as a supporting character while writing Nova, as a member of Project Pegasus during that comic's involvement with Marvel's Secret Invasion event.  In the story, it was mentioned that Necker was working on a project to develop a cyborg called "Minion." DnA said "This is us just having fun- the Death's Head thread has recently been worked back into the Marvel Universe via Planet Hulk, and we thought we would tie a few loose ends together."

Fictional character biography
Dr. Necker was a scientist working for A.I.M in the year 2020 of an alternate future. Her funding was being cut, and so her MINION cyborg supersoldier project had a few corners cut on quality. The first attempt (in 2018) was run by an automobile engine and had the brain of a homeless alcoholic. This being became known as Death Wreck, and stumbled into various cross-time adventures (as told in his own short-lived comic, Death Wreck).

Later, Dr. Necker built a superior Minion cyborg, which was designed to absorb and assimilate the memories and skills of various warriors, geniuses, and others with useful abilities from throughout time and space. However, when it took in the mind of the Freelance Peacekeeping Agent known as Death's Head, the mechanoid's personality overwhelmed the Minion's control, causing it to act erratically.

Dr. Necker followed the rogue cyborg through space-time to meet Dr. Reed Richards, one of Minion's intended targets. Dr. Necker was so excited to meet him, she gave him a kiss. When Minion and The Thing arrived seconds later, there was a brief fight, until Reed used a device to cause the Death's Head personality to fully take over. Death's Head/Minion only absorbed the data from Reed's computer instead of his brain, and thus trouble was avoided, at least until Sue Richards saw Evelyn's lipstick on Reed's collar...

Necker sought out Death's Head when a being called Charnel threatened to destroy all timelines. She found him on the world of Lionheart, and with the help of a group of Avengers from another alternate timeline, managed to defeat Charnel by tearing it in two and sending the pieces to two different times. Death's Head then informed her that Charnel was in fact another alternate future version of Death's Head, and that he was no longer subject to her commands.

Searching for another subject for the Minion project, she travelled back to 20th-century Earth (presumably the mainstream Marvel Universe), where she chose a seemingly immortal warrior called Kite. Necker believed Kite to be a mutant, but it was later revealed that he was in fact the fragment of Charnel that had been flung back in time.

While Kite was being bonded with the Minion cyborg, Death's Head and his partner Tuck, along with a group of warriors in powered armor called the Requiem Sharks, attacked the A.I.M. lab. Kite/Minion managed to bring through time the portion of Charnel that had been flung into the future, and they merged into a new Charnel.

One of the Requiem Sharks revealed that she was actually Dr. Necker's own time-travelling mother, Eliza Claire Necker, and that another of the Sharks was Evelyn's father. Dr. Necker then used a synaptic disrupter (which had been built into Minion) to disable Charnel, and set the A.I.M. time machine to self-destruct, which together with a blast from Death's Head finally destroyed Charnel.

Dr. Necker was also responsible for creating the cyborg Death Metal, which also briefly had its own series.

References

External links
Evelyn Necker at the Appendix to the Handbook of the Marvel Universe

 

Comics characters introduced in 1992
Fictional female scientists
Characters created by Dan Abnett